The Lithuanian order of precedence is a nominal and symbolic hierarchy of important positions within the Government of Lithuania. Administered by the Ministry of Foreign Affairs, the hierarchy does not determine the order of succession for the office of President of the Republic of Lithuania, which is instead specified by the Constitution of Lithuania.

Lithuanian order of precedence
President of Lithuania (Gitanas Nausėda)
Speaker of the Seimas (Viktorija Čmilytė-Nielsen)
Prime Minister of Lithuania (Ingrida Šimonytė)
President of the Constitutional Court of Lithuania (Danutė Jočienė)
Former Presidents of Lithuania:
Vytautas Landsbergis
Valdas Adamkus
Rolandas Paksas
Artūras Paulauskas
Dalia Grybauskaitė
Signatories of the Act of the Re-Establishment of the State of Lithuania, including:
Chair of Liberal Movement Political Group Eugenijus Gentvilas
MP Laima Andrikienė
Former MEP Algirdas Saudargas
MEP Rasa Juknevičienė
Member of the Seimas Emanuelis Zingeris
Former Speaker of the Seimas Česlovas Juršėnas
Former Prime Minister Kazimira Prunskienė
Former Prime Minister Albertas Šimėnas
Former Prime Minister Gediminas Vagnorius
Former Prime Minister Aleksandras Abišala
First Deputy Speaker of the Seimas (Jurgis Razma)
Ministers of the Republic of Lithuania:
Minister of Environment (Simonas Gentvilas)
Minister of Energy (Dainius Kreivys)
Minister of Finance (Gintarė Skaistė)
Minister of National Defence (Arvydas Anušauskas)
Minister of Culture (Simonas Kairys)
Minister of Social Security and Labour (Monika Navickienė)
Minister of Transport and Communications (Marius Skuodis)
Minister of Health (Arūnas Dulkys)
Minister of Education and Science (Jurgita Šiugždinienė)
Minister of Justice (Evelina Dobrovolska)
Minister of Economy (Aušrinė Armonaitė)
Minister of Foreign Affairs (Gabrielius Landsbergis)
Minister of the Interior (Agnė Bilotaitė)
Minister of Agriculture (Kęstutis Navickas)
Foreign Ambassadors, accredited to the Republic of Lithuania (by date of presentation of credentials except Nuncio who is first)
Holy See (Petar Rajič)
Sweden (Maria Christina Lundqvist)
Germany (Angelika Viets)
France (Philippe Jeantaud)
Latvia (Einars Semanis)
Denmark (Dan E. Frederiksen)
Canada (Alain Hausser)
United Kingdom (Claire Lawrence)
Italy (Francesco Fransoni)
Norway (Karsten Klepsvik)
Finland (Christer Michelsson)
Turkey (Aydan Yamancan)
Czech Republic (Bohumil Mazánek)
United States (Anne Hall)
China (Shen Zhifei)
Poland (Urszula Doroszewska)
Estonia (Jana Vanaveski)
Russia (Alexander Udaltsov)
Romania (Dan Adrian Bălănescu)
Ukraine (Volodymyr Yatsenkivskyi)
Belarus (Aleksandr Korol)
Kazakhstan (Baurzhan Mukhamejanov)
Georgia (Khatuna Salukvadze)
Japan (Toyoei Shigeeda)
Netherlands (Bert van der Lingen)
Hungary (Kátai Ildikó)
Spain (Miguel Arias Estevez)
Sovereign Military Order of Malta (Manfred Leo Mautner Markhof)
Greece (Vassiliki Dicopoulou)
Ireland (David Noonan)
Moldova (Serghei Mihov)
Azerbaijan (vacant)
Armenia (Tigran Mkrtchyan)
Croatia (Krešimir Kedmenec)
Israel (Amir Maimon)
President of the Supreme Court of Lithuania (Rimvydas Norkus)
President of the Supreme Administrative Court of Lithuania (Gintaras Kryževičius)
Deputy Speakers of the Seimas:
Andrius Mazuronis
Vytautas Mitalas
Radvilė Morkūnaitė-Mikulėnienė
Julius Sabatauskas
Paulius Saudargas
Jonas Jarutis
Leader of the Opposition of the Seimas (vacant)
Chairs of the Committees of the Seimas:
Chair of the Committee on Foreign Affairs (Laima Andrikienė)
Chair of the Committee on Audit (Zigmantas Balčytis)
Chair of the Committee on Budget and Finance (Mykolas Majauskas)
Chair of the Committee on Economics (Kazys Starkevičius)
Chair of the Committee on Rural Affairs (Viktoras Pranckietis)
Chair of the Committee on Culture (Vytautas Juozapaitis)
Chair of the Committee on National Security and Defence (Laurynas Kasčiūnas)
Chair of the Committee on Social Affairs and Labour (Mindaugas Lingė)
Chair of the Committee on Health Affairs (Antanas Matulas)
Chair of the Committee on Education and Science (Artūras Žukauskas)
Chair of the Committee on Legal Affairs (Stasys Šedbaras)
Chair of the Committee on State Administration and Local Authorities (Ričardas Juška)
Chair of the Committee on Human Rights (Tomas Vytautas Raskevičius)
Chairs of the Political Groups of the Seimas of the Republic of Lithuania:
Homeland Union - Lithuanian Christian Democrats Political Group (Radvilė Morkūnaitė-Mikulėnienė)
Liberal Movement Political Group (Eugenijus Gentvilas)
Freedom Party Political Group (Vytautas Mitalas)
Farmers and Greens Union Political Group (Aušrinė Norkienė)
Democrats "For Lithuania" Political Group (Linas Kukuraitis)
Lithuanian Social Democratic Party Political Group (Gintautas Paluckas)
Labour Party Political Group (Viktoras Fiodorovas)
Lithuanian Regions Political Group (Jonas Pinskus)
Members of the Thirteenth Seimas
Members of the European Parliament representing Lithuania:
Petras Auštrevičius
Vilija Blinkevičiūtė
Andrius Kubilius
Rasa Juknevičienė
Juozas Olekas
Aušra Maldeikienė
Bronis Ropė
Valdemar Tomaševski
Viktor Uspaskich
The Seimas Ombudsman (Erika Leonaitė)
The highest hierarch of the Catholic Church in Lithuania (Cardinal Audrys Juozas Bačkis)
Chief of Defence of Lithuania (gen. ltn. Valdemaras Rupšys)
Chairman of the Board of the Bank of Lithuania (Gediminas Šimkus)
Prosecutor General of Lithuania (Nida Grunskienė)
Auditor General at National Audit Office of Lithuania (Mindaugas Macijauskas)
Members of the Constitutional Court of Lithuania:
Elvyra Baltutytė
Gintaras Goda
Vytautas Greičius
Danutė Jočienė
Gediminas Mesonis
Vytas Milius
Daiva Petrylaitė
Janina Stripeikienė
Judges of the Supreme Court of Lithuania
Armanas Abramavičius
Rima Ažubalytė
Dalia Bajerčiūtė
Danguolė Bublienė
Alė Bukavinienė
Gražina Davidonienė
Olegas Fedosiukas
Eligijus Gladutis
Virgilijus Grabinskas
Gabrielė Juodkaitė-Granskienė
Aurelijus Gutauskas
Birutė Janavičiūtė
Janina Januškienė
Sigita Jokimaitė
Audronė Kartanienė
Pranas Kuconis
Egidijus Laužikas
Andžej Maciejevski
Vytautas Masiokas
Rimvydas Norkus
Algis Norkūnas
Artūras Pažarskis
Alvydas Pikelis
Aldona Rakauskienė
Artūras Ridikas
Sigita Rudėnaitė
Gediminas Sagatys
Antanas Simniškis
Donatas Šernas
Tomas Šeškauskas
Algirdas Taminskas
Dalia Vasarienė
Vincas Verseckas
Chancellor of the Office of the President of the Republic of Lithuania (Giedrius Krasauskas)
Chancellor of the Seimas (Daiva Raudonienė)
Chancellor of the Government (Algirdas Stončaitis)
Director of the State Security Department of Lithuania (Darius Jauniškis)
Director of the Special Investigation Service (Žydrūnas Bartkus)
Chairman of the Court of Appeal of Lithuania (Algimantas Valantinas)
Vice-Ministers of the Republic of Lithuania
Chancellors of the ministries of the Republic of Lithuania 
City Mayor (at city event)
President of Lithuanian Academy of Sciences (Jūras Banys)
President of Lithuanian Bishops' Conference (Gintaras Grušas)
Highest Authorities of traditional religious confessions:
Evangelical Lutheran Church of Lithuania (Mindaugas Sabutis)
Lithuanian Evangelical Reformed Church (Tomas Šernas)
Greek Catholic Church (Pavel Jachimec)
Jewish Religious Community) (Sholom Ber Krinsky)
Karaite Religious Community) (Jurij Špakovski)
Sunni Muftiate of Lithuania (Ramazanas Jakubauskas)
Eastern Orthodoxy (Inokentijus, Metropolitan of Vilnius and Lithuania)
Religious Community of Old Believers (Grigorij Bojarov)
Ambassadors of the Republic of Lithuania
Police Commissioner General of Lithuania (Linas Pernavas)
Head of the Lithuanian State Border Guard Service (gen. Renatas Požėla)
Director of the VIP Protection Department of Lithuania (gen. Rymantas Mockevičius)
Head of the Public Security Service (gen. Ričardas Pocius)
Equal Opportunities Ombudsperson of Lithuania (Agneta Skardžiuvienė)
Children's rights Ombudsperson of Lithuania (Edita Žiobienė)
Former Speakers of the Seimas:
Viktoras Muntianas
Arūnas Valinskas
Vydas Gedvilas
Loreta Graužinienė
Former Prime Ministers of the Republic of Lithuania:
Adolfas Šleževičius
Chairman of the Lithuanian Central Electoral Commission (Laura Matjošaitytė)
Chairman of the Chief Official Ethics Commission of the Republic of Lithuania (Edmundas Sakalauskas)
Rectors of the High Schools – Graduate Universities
Advisers to the President of the Republic of Lithuania 
Advisers to the Speaker of the Seimas
Advisers to the Prime Minister of the Republic of Lithuania
Chiefs of the main branches of the Lithuanian Armed Forces:
Commander of the Lithuanian Land Force (brig. gen. Valdemaras Rupšys)
Commander of the Lithuanian Air Force (plk. Dainius Guzas)
Commander of the Lithuanian Navy (jūrų kpt. Arūnas Mockus)
Chief of the Joint Staff of the Lithuanian Armed Forces (gen. mjr. Vitalijus Vaikšnoras)
Representative of the Government of the Republic of Lithuania in the European Court of Human Rights (Karolina Bubnytė)
Director of the Department of State and Diplomatic Protocol of the Ministry of Foreign Affairs (Neilas Tankevičius)
President of the Association of Local Authorities in Lithuania (Ričardas Malinauskas)
Mayors of other cities of Lithuania
Government representatives in the counties
Chargé d‘Affaires of foreign states

References

Lists of office-holders in Lithuania
Orders of precedence